Capital City or Capitol City or variants, may refer to:

Capital city 
Capital city, the area of a country, province, region, or state regarded as enjoying primary status
Capital City (sternwheeler), a steamboat of the Puget Sound Mosquito Fleet, in the state of Washington, U.S.
Capital City (TV series), a television show produced by Euston Films and set in London
Capital City Bombers, a former Minor League Baseball team based in Columbia, South Carolina
Capital City Distribution, a company that distributed comic books from 1980 to 1996
Capital City (The Simpsons), a fictional place in a television cartoon series
Capital City: Gentrification and the Real Estate State, a book by Sam Stein

Capital cities 
 Capital Cities Communications, US media company
 Capital Cities (band), American pop duo

Capitol city 
Capitol City, Kentucky was a plan for a new capital of the United States, along with the Western District of Columbia, across the Ohio River from Metropolis, Illinois
 Capitol City, Colorado is a ghost town founded in 1877

Cap city 

 Cap City Percussion, a WGI world class indoor drumline based in Columbus, Ohio

See also
 Capital (disambiguation)
 Capitol (disambiguation)
 City (disambiguation)